Hina Tasleem (also written as Heena Rehmaan) is an Indian actress who acted in several films.

Biography
Tasleem made her debut in Bollywood with I Proud to Be an Indian which was released in 2004. In 2005 her film Fun – Can Be Dangerous Sometimes was released. Her film Ladies Tailor was released in 2006. She also worked in Ghutan which was released in 2007.

Tasleem's film Meri Padosan was released in 2009. Her film Meri Life Mein Uski Wife was released in 2009 too. In 2010  her film Ajab Devra Ka Gazab Bhauji was released which was a Bhojpuri film. Her film Sheetalbhabi.com was released in 2011.

Filmography

References

External links
 

Living people
Indian film actresses
Actresses in Hindi cinema
Actresses in Bhojpuri cinema
Year of birth missing (living people)